Terig Tucci (June 23, 1897 – February 28, 1973) was an Argentine  composer, violinist, pianist, and mandolinist.

Tucci was born in Buenos Aires, in 1897. His first composition, “Cariños de madre” was performed for a zarzuela at the Avenida Theatre in 1917. Following a career as a violinist in local cinema orchestras, he left for New York City in 1923. From 1930 to 1941 he performed for NBC Radio. Recording label RCA Victor named Tucci executive producer of their lucrative Latin American music unit in 1932. In 1934 he performed with fellow countryman Carlos Gardel during the tango vocalist's Paramount Pictures contract.

Remaining at the helm of RCA Victor's Latin unit, Tucci served as lead music arranger for CBS' Pan American Symphony Orchestra from 1940 to 1949 where he collaborated with the accordionist John Serry Sr. and the conductor Alfredo Antonini on the radio program Viva America. During this tenure at CBS in New York City, he also collaborated with singers Juan Arvizu, Nestor Mesta Chaires and Elsa Miranda.
He also performed for General Electric from 1941 to 1947, and for the Voice of America, from 1951 to 1959. Tucci led his tango orchestra in numerous RCA recordings, including “My Buenos Aires” in 1958. He retired from RCA Victor in 1964. In 1969, Tucci wrote a reflection on Gardel's last days, Gardel en Nueva York. He lived out his own final years in his Forest Hills, Queens home. He died during a visit to Buenos Aires in 1973 and was buried in New York.

References

External links
 
 Record albums - Terig Tucci y su Orquesta de la Columbia Broadcasting System - Performances by Terig Tucci on archive.org 

Argentine composers
Argentine pianists
Male pianists
Argentine violinists
Argentine people of Italian descent
American people of Argentine descent
People from Buenos Aires
1897 births
1973 deaths
20th-century composers
20th-century pianists
20th-century violinists